Endothelin converting enzyme 1, also known as ECE1, is an enzyme which in humans is encoded by the ECE1 gene.

Function 

Endothelin-converting enzyme-1 is involved in the proteolytic processing of endothelin-1 (EDN1), -2 (EDN2), and -3 (EDN3) to biologically active peptides.

References

Further reading